Pursuant to Article 55 of the Law on Internal Regulations of the Islamic Consultative Assembly (Parliament of the Islamic Republic of Iran), the Civil Commission of the Islamic Consultative Assembly is formed to perform its assigned duties in the fields of road maintenance and transportation, housing, urban and rural development, and civil affairs of municipalities in accordance with the provisions of the regulation.

Scope of duties 
The scope of duties of the Civil Commission can be classified into three general categories: housing and urban management, transportation, and development projects. The following are some of the most important commission's challenges in these fields:

 Transport fleet safety issues and the use of technology to improve
 How to price energy in different types of transportation
 Level of efficiency and operation of infrastructure and fleet
 Review of urban management structure
 Realization of urban regeneration and improvement, renovation and empowerment of dysfunctional urban fabric
 Low-income housing support policies
 The transition from vehicle and motorized purely transportation system to human-centered system
 Improving the strength of cities
 Issues related to public and private participation in infrastructure projects

Committees 
The Civil Commission of the Islamic Consultative Assembly has seven working groups as follows:

Members 
The members of the Civil Commission of the Islamic Consultative Assembly in the second year of the 11th term of the Assembly are as follows:

See also 
 Program, Budget and Accounting Commission of the Islamic Consultative Assembly
 Education, Research and Technology Commission of the Islamic Consultative Assembly
 Social Commission of the Islamic Consultative Assembly
 Health and Medical Commission of the Islamic Consultative Assembly
 Internal Affairs of the Country and Councils Commission of the Islamic Consultative Assembly
 Industries and Mines Commission of the Islamic Consultative Assembly
 Cultural Commission of the Islamic Consultative Assembly
 The history of the parliament in Iran

References

Committees of the Iranian Parliament
Islamic Consultative Assembly